St. Michael and All Angels Church, in Bassett, Southampton, is an Anglican parish church which dates from the late 19th century.

Location
The church is situated on the eastern side of Bassett Avenue, Southampton, described by Pevsner & Lloyd as "part of the splendid tree-lined route into Southampton from Winchester, London and the north".

The church is in the parish of North Stoneham and Bassett and has the largest congregation of the three churches in the parish.

Architecture

Exterior
The church exterior, in plain red stock brick with Monks Park stone dressings for the doors and windows, slated roof and small bell-turret on its western gable, is not particularly impressive; but with its concrete vaulted roof supported on stone ribs, Pevsner and Lloyd, in their Buildings of England: Hampshire and the Isle of Wight, considered that it has "an intriguing and distinguished design internally".

Interior
The church has a nave with  four broad rib-vaulted bays separated from the chancel by a rood-screen surmounted by a carving depicting the Crucifixion of Jesus.

The west window was given in 1962, by Hector Young an ex-mayor of Southampton, in memory of his wife Ethel who was killed in the Blitz in September 1940. The window, showing the Archangel Michael defeating Satan, was designed by Francis Skeat.

History

Parish
The original parish of North Stoneham can be traced back to the early ninth century when it was known as "Stonam Abbatis" or "Abbots Stoneham" and was attached to Hyde Abbey at Winchester. At this time, the parish extended from the River Itchen in the east towards Chilworth and Bassett Green in the west with its neighbouring parish, South Stoneham, to the south and east. After the dissolution of the monasteries in the 1540s, the manor was acquired by Thomas Wriothesley, Earl of Southampton. In 1599, the Wriothesley family sold the estate to Sir Thomas Fleming, whose descendants held the advowson until 1997. Until the late nineteenth century, Bassett was part of the parish of North Stoneham, with the rector of St. Nicolas' Church serving the needs of the entire parish. Revd. Elliott Kenworthy-Browne, the rector of North Stoneham from 1886 to 1912, would often walk over 10 miles a day to meet the needs of his parishioners.

By the mid-1880s, Bassett had grown with many substantial villas occupied by the middle classes; despite having the appearance of a well-to-do suburb of Southampton, Revd. Kenworthy-Browne observed that three-quarters of the population of 800 were poor, chiefly mechanics and labourers.

The parish has since been renamed North Stoneham and Bassett, and encompasses North Stoneham, the whole of Bassett, the portion of Bassett Green north of Bassett Green Road, and the portion of Chilworth within the M3/M27 triangle. The parish also covers Southampton Airport.

Church
When Mr. Kenworthy-Browne came to North Stoneham in 1886, mission services were held in a small coach-house close to the Redhill brickyards. Later, in 1888, a mission room in Winchester Road was opened.

A legacy in the will of John Brown Willis Fleming of Stoneham Park, left the plot of land on Bassett Avenue on which the new church was to be built. The new church was designed by Edward Prioleau Warren, with the foundation stone being laid by Violet Fleming on 29 September 1897. The church was built in two stages as the money ran out. Construction was completed in May 1910 by the contractors Messrs. Holloway Bros. of London, the total cost being £4,139. When completed, it was regarded as a quite outstanding example of its kind, and attracted visitors from as far away as America.
 
By 1934, the church needed to be extended to include an assembly room (currently used as the choir vestry). In 1937 a new altar with oak panelled reredos was added.

In 1962, the church was classified as Grade B status, but in December 1969 this was revised to "Grade II listed".

In 1980, work began on a £13,000 programme of re-roofing and protection of the brickwork from penetration by damp.

In 2011 the Victorian church pews were removed and replaced by a more flexible and comfortable system of chairs.

In October 2014 the church was placed on the Heritage at Risk Register. In his Autumn Statement that year the Chancellor announced a £15 million roofs scheme, “For the repair of roofs and rainwater goods on listed church buildings …… where roof and rainwater goods repairs are deemed to be urgent and necessary”.  Under this scheme a grant of £90,000 was awarded in March 2015.  The repair work was carried out during 2016 with completion in October 2016.

Clergy
The parish rector at the time of the consecration of St. Michael's in 1911 was Elliot Kenworthy-Browne. The current Rector, the Reverend Sheena Williams, was invested by the Bishop of Southampton, the Right Reverend Dr. Jonathan Frost, on 3 February 2017.  Rev'd Williams grew up in Linlithgow, near Edinburgh.  She gained  a law degree from the University of Aberdeen and Pierre Mendès-France University in France. After feeling a call to ordained ministry she trained at STETS (Southern Theological Education and Training Scheme) in Salisbury before ordination in 2010.  She served her title in the parish of Swaythling, Southampton, before becoming associate priest in the parish of Chandlers Ford.  She is assisted by an Associate Pioneer Minister, a curate, two honorary assistant clergy and two licensed lay ministers. Together, they share the ministry to the three churches of the Parish: St. Michael and All Angels, St. Nicolas and All Saints.

Rectors

1248  Geoffrey de Ferringes
1266  William of Monmouth
1284  Walter le Fleming
1285  W of Hambledon
1325  Robert of Worcester
1334  John Pyncebek
1349  Robert of Kelleseye
1349  John of Tudeworth
1361  Walter Gourda
1378  Thomas Marnham
1383  Thomas Evesham
1387  Thomas Chadworth
?         Edward Blenkinsop
1439  Thomas Forest
1463 Walter Hoggis
1488 Unknown
1499  Walter Piers
1513  John Piers
1521  Thomas Erlysman
1532  William Capon
1551  Roland Swynbourne
1556  Sir Thomas Newenham
1558  Thomas Securis
1559  Henry Hide
1593  Lewis Alcock
1647  John Howell
1670  George Reynolds
1670  William Perkins
1672  Thomas Holdsworth
1714  William Whitear
1723  Timothy Owen
1749  Henry Fuller
1763  Edward Beadon
1811  Frederick Beadon
1879  Arthur Buchanan Willis Fleming
1886  Elliot Kenworthy-Browne
1912  Thomas Salmon
1932  Charles Philip Stewart Clarke
1935  Harold Gordon Peile
1946  John Robert Shuckburgh Stranack
1952  William Frederick Shail
1969  Ralph Edward Pearce Serocold
1975  Robert Bernard Jones
1990  Charles Taylor
1995  John Owen
2010  Stephen Holmes (Priest-in-Charge)
2017  Sheena Williams

Worship & music

St. Michael and All Angel's Church has a middle-to-high, strongly Eucharistic style of worship. Sunday services are at 8am (BCP Holy Communion) and 10am (CW Sung Eucharist), with Choral Evensong on the 2nd & 4th Sundays at 6.30pm. There is a midweek Eucharist at 9.30am on Thursdays and a Taize Service on the last Friday of the month (except August & December) at 6.30pm.

Choir

St. Michael's has long enjoyed a strong choral tradition, which continues to the present day. The main choir is the all-age Senior Choir which sings the standard 'cathedral repertoire'. It supports the worship at the Sunday morning Eucharist and sings Choral Evensong twice a month. The choir regularly sings at both Winchester Cathedral and Chichester Cathedral to cover whilst the respective cathedral choirs are on holiday. It also travels further afield each August for a longer residence at a cathedral.

The church also has a Junior Choir which joins the Senior Choir at two services each month.

Organ

The organ was built by Rushworth and Dreaper in 1937, and is a fine example of a four rank extension instrument. It is totally enclosed in two expression chambers on the north side of the choir. The organ's four ranks consist of an open diapason (A), lieblich gedackt (B), salicional (C) and trumpet (D), which are used to create 25 speaking stops over two manuals and pedals. Ranks A&B (largely used on the great) are within one of the enclosed boxes, and ranks C&D (largely used by the swell) are within the second box. The specification can be found on the National Pipe Organ Register. The organ was refurbished in 2011 by Griffiths & Co (Organ Builders) Ltd.

References

External links
Church website
Choir website
Flickr photos gallery
Hampshire Church Windows website

Churches in Southampton
Bassett
Bassett
Churches completed in 1910
20th-century Church of England church buildings